Uqhu (Quechua for swamp, Hispanicized spelling Uco) or Ukhu (Quechua for deep) is a mountain in the Paryaqaqa mountain range in the Andes of Peru, about  high. It is situated in the Junín Region, Yauli Province, Yauli District. Uqhu lies east of a lake named Wallaqucha (Huallacocha).

References

Mountains of Peru
Mountains of Junín Region